Albert Stotland Ruddy (born March 28, 1930) is a Canadian-American film and television producer. He is known for producing The Godfather (1972) and Million Dollar Baby (2004), both of which won him the Academy Award for Best Picture, as well as co-creating the CBS sitcom Hogan's Heroes (1965–1971).

Early life 
Albert S. Ruddy was born to Ruth (née Ruddy) Hertz and Hy Stotland, a Jewish family in Montreal, and raised in New York City and in Miami Beach, Florida, by his mother. Ruddy attended Brooklyn Technical High School before earning a scholarship to allow him to study chemical engineering at City College of New York. In 1956, he graduated from the University of Southern California with a degree in architectural design.

Career
Ruddy then worked designing homes for a construction company, in Hackensack, New Jersey.

After a short stint at Warner Brothers, brought about by a chance meeting with studio chief Jack L. Warner, Ruddy moved on to become a programmer trainee at the RAND Corporation in Santa Monica, California. Returning to entertainment, Ruddy was a television writer at Universal Studios, but left when Marlon Brando Sr., father of the legendary actor, hired him to produce Wild Seed (1965).

With this film completed, Ruddy co-created Hogan's Heroes (CBS, 1965–1971), which was a critical and commercial success and ran for six seasons. As the sitcom wound down its run, Ruddy returned to films, producing two comedies: Little Fauss and Big Halsy (1970), about two motorcycle racers, and Making It (1971), about a sexually triumphant high school student who beds the gerontophobic wife of his gym teacher.

In 1972, he produced The Godfather, an adaptation of Mario Puzo's novel. The film was a massive success both commercially and critically, and is regarded as one of the best films ever made, as well as a landmark of the gangster genre. The film was nominated for eleven Academy Awards and won three – including Ruddy's first of two Oscars for Best Picture.

In 1974, Ruddy produced an adaptation of his own story treatment as The Longest Yard. The film, which has been described as "the first successful modern sports movie", was very successful financially and was subsequently remade twice with Ruddy as executive producer (as Mean Machine (2001) and as The Longest Yard (2005)).

The following year, Ruddy produced director and animator Ralph Bakshi's satirical film Coonskin (1975). The film was extremely controversial and initially received negative reviews, but it would eventually earn critical acclaim and develop a cult following with cinema devotees around the globe.  It remains one of director Quentin Tarantino's favorite movies.

In 1976, he produced a western made-for-TV movie called The Macahans, which was subsequently developed into the series How the West Was Won (1977–1979).

For some time, Ruddy worked with writer-philosopher Ayn Rand to produce her 1957 epic novel Atlas Shrugged as a movie, the rights to which he purchased in the mid-1970s, but the movie never moved beyond the planning stages. Rand demanded unprecedented final script approval, which Ruddy agreed to. However, her friends pointed out that Ruddy could shoot the approved script but still leave all her speeches on the cutting room floor. Rand asked for final editing approval, which neither Ruddy nor the director had the power to give her, so she responded by withdrawing her support from the film and vowing to ensure that Ruddy was never involved in any adaptation of her novel.

Ruddy then started to work with Hong Kong's Golden Harvest, producing The Cannonball Run (1981), a hugely successful film at the box office that received mixed reviews by critics. However today, this Burt Reynolds film enjoys a devoted following from followers of the Rat Pack. Ruddy next produced two action films, Death Hunt (1981) starring Lee Marvin and Charles Bronson, and Megaforce (1982). Ruddy returned to produce Cannonball Run II (1984), which was another commercial success for the Rat-Pack-prominent cast, and featured a guest appearance by Frank Sinatra. The film also features a rare on-screen cameo by Ruddy in a scene spoofing his film The Godfather, and including Godfather supporting actors Alex Rocco and Abe Vigoda.

In 1985, after leaving Golden Harvest, Ruddy and Andre Morgan set up the Ruddy Morgan Organization which produces films budgeted for the $8.5-16 million range, and arranges the financing and developing of "high-visibility" pictures the company is placing up.

In the early 1990s, he helped create the successful series Walker, Texas Ranger. Also in 1992, he licensed the rights from Kevin McClory to make a James Bond television show, but Eon Productions blocked it, and winning the suit, ended any hopes of a television show. On March 5, 2022, Amazon, MGM Television, and 72 Films announced a James Bond reality show.

In 2004, he produced Million Dollar Baby, which earned him his second Oscar for Best Picture. He shared the award with Clint Eastwood, who had presented Ruddy with the Best Picture Oscar for The Godfather over 30 years earlier.

In late 2015, it was announced that he had acquired the rights to Rand's Atlas Shrugged and would be making a movie for worldwide release.

In 2021, his daughter Alexandra Ruddy became co-principal at Albert S. Ruddy Productions.

Personal life
Ruddy was originally married to and divorced from Francoise Ruddy, who was also Jewish. This was prior to her name change  to Ma Prem Hasya as part of the Rajneeshpuram Commune in Central Oregon. Francoise saw him through the production of The Godfather, even lending her name to the production company title.

Ruddy is currently married to Wanda McDaniel, the mother of his two children, John Ruddy and Alexandra Ruddy. Since 1980, McDaniel has been an executive vice president for the Italian designer Giorgio Armani, where she is credited with inventing the red carpet and helping to make Armani into a fashion icon.

In the 2022 biographical drama miniseries The Offer, which dramatizes the making of The Godfather and is executive produced by Ruddy, he is played by Miles Teller.

Filmography
He was a producer in all films unless otherwise noted.

Film

As writer

Art director

Soundtrack

Thanks

Television

As writer

Miscellaneous crew

As an actor

Thanks

Awards
 Won: 1973 Academy Award for Best Picture: The Godfather
 Won: 1973 David di Donatello for Best Foreign Film: The Godfather
 Won: 1973 Golden Globe Award for Best Motion Picture – Drama: The Godfather
 Won: 1975 Golden Globe Award for Best Motion Picture – Musical or Comedy: The Longest Yard
 Nomination: 1983 Golden Raspberry Award for Worst Picture: Megaforce
 Nomination: 1984 Golden Raspberry Award for Worst Picture: Cannonball Run II
 Nomination: 1985 Golden Raspberry Award for Worst Screenplay: Cannonball Run II (with Hal Needham and Harvey Miller)
 Won: 2005 Academy Award for Best Picture: Million Dollar Baby

See also
 Canadian pioneers in early Hollywood

References

External links
 
 "The Godfather Wars" Vanity Fair
 Profile from Mass Hysteria Entertainment
 Ruddy Morgan Organization

1930 births
Living people
Film producers from Quebec
Jewish Canadian filmmakers
20th-century American Jews
People from New York City
People from Montreal
Producers who won the Best Picture Academy Award
USC School of Architecture alumni
City College of New York alumni
Golden Globe Award-winning producers
Brooklyn Technical High School alumni
21st-century American Jews